The canton of Loiron-Ruillé (before March 2020: canton of Loiron) is an administrative division of the Mayenne department, northwestern France. Its borders were not modified at the French canton reorganisation which came into effect in March 2015. Its seat is in Loiron-Ruillé.

It consists of the following communes:
 
Beaulieu-sur-Oudon
Le Bourgneuf-la-Forêt
Bourgon
La Brûlatte
Le Genest-Saint-Isle
La Gravelle
Launay-Villiers
Loiron-Ruillé
Montjean
Olivet
Port-Brillet
Saint-Cyr-le-Gravelais
Saint-Ouën-des-Toits
Saint-Pierre-la-Cour

References

Cantons of Mayenne